Ashland is a town in Benton County, Mississippi, United States and the county seat. The population was 569 at the 2010 census. Ashland was incorporated on March 8, 1871, and has a Mayor-Aldermen form of government. Mitch Carroll is the 28th mayor of Ashland.

History
Ashland was established in 1871 as the county seat for the Benton County, which had been created the previous year.  The Benton County Courthouse, the focus of the town's main square, was constructed in 1873.  Many of Ashland's earliest residents had relocated from Salem, an older community to the west that had been destroyed during the Civil War.

Geography
The town is concentrated along Mississippi Highway 370, east of its intersection with Mississippi Highway 5.

Climate
The climate in this area is characterized by hot, humid summers and generally mild to cool winters. According to the Köppen Climate Classification system, Ashland has a humid subtropical climate, abbreviated "Cfa" on climate maps.

Demographics

2020 census

As of the 2020 United States census, there were 551 people, 207 households, and 100 families residing in the town.

2000 census
As of the census of 2000, there were 577 people, 207 households, and 142 families residing in the town. The population density was 316.0 people per square mile (121.7/km2). There were 227 housing units at an average density of 124.3 per square mile (47.9/km2). The racial makeup of the town was 95.1% White, 0.8% African American, 0.5% Native American, 0.4% Asian, 0.2% from other races, and 3.1% from two or more races. Hispanic or Latino of any race were 1.7% of the population.

There were 207 households, out of which 25.6% had children under the age of 18 living with them, 55.1% were married couples living together, 11.6% had a female householder with no husband present, and 31.4% were non-families. 28.5% of all households were made up of individuals, and 17.4% had someone living alone who was 65 years of age or older. The average household size was 2.23 and the average family size was 2.68.

In the town, the population was spread out, with 15.9% under the age of 18, 8.7% from 18 to 24, 22.5% from 25 to 44, 21.8% from 45 to 64, and 31.0% who were 65 years of age or older. The median age was 47 years. For every 100 females, there were 83.8 males. For every 100 females age 18 and over, there were 87.3 males.

The median income for a household in the town was $28,088, and the median income for a family was $29,911. Males had a median income of $24,375 versus $20,455 for females. The per capita income for the town was $14,073. About 14.6% of families and 19.4% of the population were below the poverty line, including 30.2% of those under age 18 and 22.1% of those age 65 or over.

Government
As of 2018, the mayor of Ashland is Mitch Carroll, and Sandra Gresham, Greg Thompson, Mark Ehrie, and Rocky Miller, make up the Board of Aldermen. Carroll was elected mayor in 2007 in a special election to fill the vacancy left by Bill Stone, who had been elected to the Mississippi State Senate.  Carroll defeated his brother, Mike Carroll, by 17 votes to secure the position.

Education
Ashland Academy was established in Ashland in 1882.

Ashland is served by the Benton County School District. Ashland High School is the public high school in Ashland and serves students from Benton County, Mississippi.

Notable people
 Willie Mitchell, musician and owner of Hi Records
 Bill Renick, former Chief of Staff for Ronnie Musgrove
 Bill Stone, mayor of Ashland from 2001 to 2007
 Daniel B. Wright, U.S. Representative for Mississippi's 1st congressional district from 1853 to 1857

References

External links

Town of Ashland official website

Towns in Benton County, Mississippi
Towns in Mississippi
County seats in Mississippi
Populated places established in 1871
1871 establishments in Mississippi